Giruwa Ambalama (Sinhala:ගිරුවා අම්බලම) is a historic wayside rest beside the Aluth Nuwara Dedimunda Devalaya site built by Queen Sunetradevi chief consort of King Parakramabahu II (A.D 1236-1276) and mother of King Bhuvanekabahu I. The pillars remaining at the site are supposed to be belonging to the period of King Bhuvanekabahu I. It has been conserved by the Archaeological department at least three times.

See also 
Panavitiya Ambalama
Appallagoda Ambalama
Kadugannawa Ambalama

References

Buildings and structures in Sabaragamuwa Province
Archaeological protected monuments in Kegalle District